Centro Empresarial Nações Unidas, (Portuguese: United Nations Business Center) is a commercial complex located in the city of São Paulo, in the Brooklin Novo neighborhood in the district of Santo Amaro. It is located between the Marginal Pinheiros and Engenheiro Luís Carlos Berrini Avenue, with the main entrance along Engenheiro Luís Carlos Berrini Avenue. It has  of building area, including shopping center and the West, North, and East Towers. Started in 1989, the project was completed around the year 2000, due to economic problems.

Currently, the tower is home to several multinational companies, including, Microsoft, Hewlett-Packard, Monsanto, Towers Watson, and GVT Global Village Telecom.
The East Tower had to be redesigned internally to accommodate a luxury hotel, the Hilton – Morumbi.
The West Tower is used for offices
The South Tower has 18 floors
Plaza I has 17 floors

The complex has an underground connection with the business complex nearby, the World Trade Center São Paulo.
On November 8, 2008, the complex hosted the G20 meeting.

See also

List of tallest buildings in South America
List of tallest buildings in Brazil
Mirante do Vale
Altino Arantes Building

External links
Emporis, located at Torre Norte
Botti Rubin Arquitecture

References

Skyscrapers in São Paulo
Commercial buildings completed in 2000
Tourist attractions in São Paulo
Skyscraper office buildings in Brazil
Skyscraper hotels
Hotels in Brazil